Colin Chisholm may refer to:

 Colin Chisholm (ice hockey) (born 1963), former ice hockey defenceman
 Colin Chisholm (medical writer) (1755–1825), Scottish surgeon
 Colin Chisholm (politician) (1850–?), lawyer and political figure in Nova Scotia, Canada
 Colin Chisholm (singer) (born 1953), Scottish singer
 Colin H. Chisholm (1919–1994), Canadian politician